Šunjić is a Croatian surname. Notable people with the surname include:

Davor Šunjić (born 1980), former Croatian handball player
Ivan Šunjić (born 1996), Croatian football player
Marijan Šunjić (disambiguation), multiple people
Toni Šunjić (born 1988), Bosnian football player

Croatian surnames
Slavic-language surnames
Patronymic surnames